Sommerblut is a cultural festival in Cologne, Germany, which first took place in 2002 and offers a broad spectrum of performances, dance- and theatre productions, but also concerts, movies, art expositions and lectures.

Awards 

 2007: Cologne Dance Award together with DIN A 13 Tanzkompanie for the performance "SEX ID".
 2012: Cologne Innovation Award Disabled Policy for a theatre production covering dementia "ANDERLAND".
 2018: Nomination for the Cologne Theatre Award for a production with drug addicts "DRUGLAND".
 2019: Nomination for the Cologne Theatre Award for a production with young actors "YOUTOPIA".

Past dates and artists 

16 June – 5 July 2002
 Events: 13, i.a. Tim Fischer, Kommando Rothenberger, Janice Perry, Kordula Völker, Caspar & Bianca, Charles Ripley
 Visitors: 2.000

26 June – 11 July 2003
 Events: 16, i.a. Pe Werner, Maren Kroymann, the Pfister Siblings, dem Kommando Rothenberger, Malediva, Gayle Tufts, Rainer Bielfeldt
 Visitors: 5.000

9 June – 17 July 2004
 Events: 25, i.a. Antony and the Johnsons, Désirée Nick, Tim Fischer, Georgette Dee, Lilo Wanders, Ursula West, Kommando Rothenberger
 Visitors: 6.500

19 June – 10 July 2005
 Events: 28, i.a. Georgette Dee, Hermes Phettberg, Mirjam Müntefering, MännerKulturen, Barbara Kuster, Robert Kreis, Stefan Stoppok, Bettina Böttinger, Anka Zink, Isabel Varell, Coco Camelle
 Visitors: 8.000

18 May – 8 June 2006
 Events: 52, i.a. Tim Fischer, Georgette Dee, Katharina Thalbach, Christine Westermann, Gerburg Jahnke, Irmgard Knef, Konrad Beikircher, Gustav Peter Wöhler, Knacki Deuser, Beate Rademacher, Barbara Kuster, Rainer Bielfeldt, Christian Überschall
 Visitors: more than 10.000

16 May – 11 June 2007
 Events: 62, i.a. Georgette Dee, Dirk Bach, Désirée Nick, Herbert Feuerstein, Claude-Oliver Rudolph, Doris Kunstmann, Robert Kreis, Clueso, Jan Plewka, Anka Zink, Romy Haag, Hella von Sinnen, Rainer Bielfeldt, Lilo Wanders, Ulla Meinecke, Christine Westermann, Barbara Kuster, Ralph Morgenstern, Manes Meckenstock, Knacki Deuser, Mouron, Terry Truck, Telmo Pires

2008
 120 events at 25 locations, 20.000 visitors

2009
 150 events at 40 locations, 23.000 visitors

2010
 150 events at 45 locations, 20.000 visitors.

2011
 120 events at 35 locations, 18.000 visitors.

2012
 Topic: DEMENTIA (60 events at 25 locations, 12.000 visitors)

2013
 Topic: FLEEING (70 events at 40 locations, 11.000 visitors)

2014
 Topic: TABOO (80 events at 35 locations, 12.000 visitors)

2015
 Topic: MONEY (80 events at 30 locations, 11.000 visitors)

2016
 Topic: LOVE (80 events at 35 locations, 15.000 visitors)

2017
 Topic: INTOXICATION (38 events at 24 locations, 10.000 visitors)

2018
 Topic: BODY (31 events at 24 locations, 6.000 visitors)

2019
 Topic: FAITH (35 events at 25 locations, 13.500 visitors)

External links 
 Official website
 Listing in Directory of European Disability Arts Festivals
 Official reference by Colognes Tourism Office

Theatre festivals in Germany